The 23rd Buil Film Awards ceremony was hosted by the Busan-based daily newspaper Busan Ilbo. It was held on October 3, 2014 at the Haeundae Grand Hotel's Grand Ballroom in Busan and was emceed by actors Kwon Yul and Ryu Hyun-kyung.

Nominations and winners
Complete list of nominees and winners:

(Winners denoted in bold)

References

External links 
 

Buil Film Awards
Buil Film Awards
Buil Film Awards
October 2014 events in South Korea